Wild Wild West is an album of music inspired by the 1999 film Wild Wild West. It was released June 15, 1999, through Interscope Records and consisted mostly of hip hop and R&B songs which were not in the film, with the exception of one by Will Smith and another by Enrique Iglesias played over the end credits. Other artists featured on the album include BLACKstreet, Faith Evans, Dr. Dre, Common, MC Lyte, Tatyana Ali, Slick Rick, Jermaine Dupri and Eminem. The soundtrack was very successful, peaking at number four on the US Billboard 200 and on the Top R&B/Hip-Hop Albums and features the hit single "Wild Wild West" which went to number one on the US Billboard Hot 100. The album was certified double platinum a week after its release, June 21, 1999. The album is also the debut of famous artists Lil' Bow Wow, Jill Scott and Kel Spencer.

Track listing

Charts

Weekly charts

Year-end charts

Certifications

References

External links

1999 soundtrack albums
Hip hop soundtracks
Rhythm and blues soundtracks
Interscope Records soundtracks
Western film soundtracks
Action film soundtracks
Comedy film soundtracks